The frigate tuna, frigate mackerel or alagaduwa (Auxis thazard) is a species of tuna, in the family Scombridae, found around the world in tropical oceans. The eastern Pacific population is now regarded as a separate species by some authorities, Auxis brachydorax.

Parasites 
As most fishes, the frigate tuna harbours a number of parasites. Among these are a series of digeneans, which are parasititic within the intestine.

References

frigate tuna
Pantropical fish
frigate tuna
Taxa named by Bernard Germain de Lacépède